Carex capillacea, common name yellowleaf sedge in Tasmania, is a species of sedge (in the Cyperaceae family) found in Assam, the far east of Russia, New Guinea, south east Australia, New Zealand, Malesia, China, Japan and India.

Description
Carex capillacea is densely tufted. The leaves are usually shorter than culms,  and the sheath is green to pale brown. The inflorescence  is erect and has one spike. The male portion of the spike is above the female portion. The style is divided into three parts.

It flowers from October to December, fruits from October to July, and the nuts are dispersed by granivory and wind.

Distribution & habitat
In New Zealand it is found on the North Island on the Waimarino Plain, and the Moawhango and in the South Island  from Nelson and  Marlborough south to the lakes of Te Anau, Manapouri, Hauroko and east to Lumsden. Its preferred habitat is bogs, seepages,  and the margins of ponds and  pools.

Conservation status
Assessments under the New Zealand Threat Classification System (NZTCS), declared it to be "At Risk – Naturally Uncommon" (NU) in 2013, and in 2017  to be "Threatened – Nationally Vulnerable" (NV). In Tasmania, it is declared "Threatened".

Taxonomy & naming

The specific epithet, capillacea, derives from the Latin capillus "hair" or "thread", and thus describes the plant as being thread-like.

References

External links
Carex capillacea New Zealand Plant Conservation Network 
Carex capillacea occurrence data from GBIF
 pdf

capillacea
Plants described in 1858
Taxa named by Francis Boott
Flora of New Zealand
Flora of Australia
Flora of New Guinea